Needle Rock View Point is a tourist spot in Gudalur, The Nilgiris, Tamil Nadu. Where the Gudalur is located 51 km on the west of Ooty and the Needle Rock viewpoint is about 8 km from Gudalur on the way of Gudalur-Ooty National Highway-67. The view point gives you a 360 degree view. The view point is also known as Oosi malai and gets its name from its conical shape. The word Oosi malai originated from Tamil Language. Oosi means needle; Malai means Mountain.  

 It is a shooting range for many of the Tamil films.  Needle Rock View Point is visibly seen in Chinna Poove Mella Pesu, a popular Tamil film.

See also
 Mudumalai Wildlife Sanctuary
 Gudalur
 Pykara

References

Tourist attractions in Nilgiris district